The William Boggs Farm is located in the Back Creek Valley of Berkeley County, West Virginia ner Hedgesville. The property was settled before 1750 by William Boggs, who may have been the first settler in the valley. A 1750 survey indicates that Boggs had  of land with a cabin. By 1766 Boggs had accumulated . Boggs grew cash crops in the fertile bottomlands along Back Creek and raised clover for pasturage on the hilltops.

After William Sr.'s death in 1791, his son, William Boggs, Jr. took over the land, working the farm until his death in 1836. The property was divided between Willam Jr.'s son John, with and daughter Jane with .In 1846 John sold his share for $2000 to Jane's husband, Thomas C. Harper. The farm was inherited in 1884 by John Boggs' daughter Theresa, who had lived at the firm with the Harpers. Encumbered by debts she inherited with the property, Theresa was forced to sell in 1887 to D.E. Stone.

The -story log house features a center hall plan with a room on each side of the main stair hall and two rooms upstairs. The interior log surfaces were whitewashed. Interior walls are beaded board. Mantels and stairs feature decorative carving of good quality for such a remote location. The exterior is clad with wide planking.

Nearby on the property a two-level root cellar is dug into a hillside, with entrances to the upper and lower levels on opposite sides. The farm was listed on the National Register of Historic Places in 2001.

References

Farms on the National Register of Historic Places in West Virginia
Houses completed in 1790
Houses in Berkeley County, West Virginia
Houses on the National Register of Historic Places in West Virginia
I-house architecture in West Virginia
National Register of Historic Places in Berkeley County, West Virginia
Log buildings and structures on the National Register of Historic Places in West Virginia